Timur Khalilovich Abdrashitov (born 19 April 2002) is a Russian football player. He plays for FC Amkar Perm.

Club career
He made his debut in the Russian Professional Football League for FC Zvezda Perm on 9 August 2020 in a game against FC Lada-Togliatti.

He made his debut in the Russian Football National League for FC Torpedo Moscow on 13 October 2021 in a game against FC Krasnodar-2.

On 16 August 2022, his contract with Torpedo was terminated by mutual consent.

Honours
Torpedo Moscow
 Russian Football National League : 2021-22

References

External links
 
 Profile by Russian Football National League 2
 Profile by Russian Football National League

2002 births
Sportspeople from Perm, Russia
Living people
Russian footballers
Association football midfielders
FC Zvezda Perm players
FC Torpedo Moscow players
FC Amkar Perm players
Russian Second League players
Russian First League players